Ellada Eheis Talento is a Greek reality television series and is part of the Got Talent multinational franchise. It premiered in Greece for the first time on 23 March 2007 and ended after 4 seasons on 25 June 2012 on the ANT1. On 1 October 2017 the show came back with the fifth season and for the first time from Skai TV, ended after 2 seasons on 16 December 2018. On 8 January 2022 the show returned again on ANT1.

Format

It has been one of the most successful Greek TV shows over the 2007-2012 period. It is a talent show that features singers, 
dancers, magicians, comedians and other performers of all ages competing for the advertised prize of €100,000. From season 5 the advertised prize of €50,000. It did not only feature Greek people, but also ones from the Greek diaspora. Like the British format, the auditions take place in front of the judges and a live audience. At any time during the audition the judges may show disapproval to the act by pressing a buzzer which lights a red X near them. If all of the judges press their buzzers, the act ends immediately. To advance to the second round, participants need to get at least two positive votes or they would be sent home. From series 5, a new feature was added to the auditions, which had been previously used on Germany's Got Talent, called the "Golden Buzzer". Situated in the centre of the judge's desk, the Golden Buzzer allows a judge to effectively send a contestant(s) into the live semi-finals, regardless of the opinions of the other judges, if they felt that a contestant's performance was outstanding; when pressed, the judge's X turns gold and the stage is showered in gold glitter strips. However, as a general rule, they may only press it once and cannot press it again in later auditions. The semi-final and final shows are broadcast live from Athens.

Season summary

Seasons

Season 1 (2007) 
                                                                                        
The first season of Ellada Eheis Talento premiered on 23 March 2007 and ended on 15 June 2007. The winner of the first series was 12-year-old singer Christos Zacharopoulos.

Season 2 (2009) 

The second season of the show started on 24 April 2009 and ended on 3 July 2009. The series was won by the band Kiss Madiam.

Season 3 (2010) 

The third season of the show started on 19 March 2010 and ended on 4 June 2010. It was won by 55-year-old singer Nikos Georgas .

Season 4 (2012) 
                                                                                                                              
ANT1 has announced that the show has been renewed for a fourth season. The show started on 25 March 2012. It was won by 14-year-old student Stelios Legakis (singer/guitar player).

Season 5 (2017) 
The fifth season premiered on 1 October 2017 on Skai TV. The host is Giorgos Lianos and the judges are Sakis Tanimanidis, Maria Bakodimou and Giorgos Kapoutzidis. It was won by acting group House of Drama.

Auditions

Golden Buzzer acts

Judge Cuts
Each episode will feature a guest-star judge, who will have the ability to hit the golden buzzer and send the act to the semis. For the first episode, the guest-star was Greek presenter and host Fotis Sergoulopoulos, and aired on Monday, 20 November.

Guests

Semi-finals
The first semi-final aired on Tuesday 12 December. The second semi-final is set to air on Sunday, 17 December.

Finalists

Season 6 (2018) 
The sixth season premiered on 30 September 2018 on Skai TV. The host is Giorgos Lianos and the judges are Sakis Tanimanidis, Maria Bakodimou and Giorgos Kapoutzidis. It was won by acting group En Xoro.

Season 7 (2022) 
The seventh season premiered on 8 January 2022 on ANT1. The hosts were Nikos Raptis and Stavros Svigos. The judges were Crystallia Riga, Elena Christopoulou, Grigoris Arnaoutoglou and Takis Zaharatos. It was won by 14 year old singer Konstantinos Tsamados.

References

ANT1 original programming
2007 Greek television series debuts
2000s Greek television series
2010s Greek television series
Greece
Greek reality television series
Greek music television series
Television series by Fremantle (company)
Greek television series based on British television series